Richard Marc Losick (born 1943) is an American molecular biologist. He is the Maria Moors Cabot Professor of Biology at Harvard University, a Howard Hughes Medical Institute Professor. He is especially noted for his investigations of endospore formation in Gram positive organisms such as Bacillus subtilis.

Education and career 
Losick received his AB in Chemistry from Princeton University in 1965, and his PhD in biochemistry from Massachusetts Institute of Technology in 1969. Following his graduate studies, Losick was named a Junior Fellow of the Harvard Society of Fellows. He joined the Harvard faculty in 1972. He has held the position of chairman in the Departments of Cellular and Developmental Biology and Molecular and Cellular Biology. Along with Daniel Kahne, Robert Lue, and Susan Mango, he teaches Life Sciences 1a, an introductory biology and chemistry course, which was the fourth largest lecture course taught at Harvard College in 2015.

Research 
Losick's research interests include RNA polymerase, sigma factors, regulation of gene transcription, and bacterial development. He is known for his studies of asymmetric division in Bacillus subtilis, which divides to form one endospore and one nurturing cell. Currently, Losick studies biofilm formation by the opportunistic pathogen Staphylococcus aureus. His research group has demonstrated that chromosomal DNA is recycled to form an electrostatic extracellular net in order to hold neighboring bacterial cells together.

Awards and honors 
 Camille and Henry Dreyfus Teacher-Scholar Award, The Camille and Henry Dreyfus Foundation (1973)
 Member, National Academy of Sciences (1992)
 Member, American Academy of Arts and Sciences (1996)
 Member, American Association for the Advancement of Science (1998)
 Fellow, American Academy of Microbiology (elected prior to 2000)
 Visiting Fellow, Phi Beta Kappa (2000)
 Member, American Philosophical Society (2005)
 Selman A. Waksman Award in Microbiology, National Academy of Sciences (2007)
 Gairdner Foundation International Award (2009)
 Louisa Gross Horwitz Prize, Columbia University (2012)

References

External links
Research Summary & Profile, Harvard University
Biography of Richard M. Losick on the Howard Hughes Medical Institute site

Living people
1943 births
Princeton University alumni
Massachusetts Institute of Technology School of Science alumni
Harvard University faculty
Members of the United States National Academy of Sciences
Howard Hughes Medical Investigators
Place of birth missing (living people)
Members of the American Philosophical Society